New South Wales Blues may refer to:
 Netball New South Wales Blues
 New South Wales cricket team
 New South Wales rugby league team